Holly Brooks (born April 17, 1982) is an American cross-country skier from Seattle, Washington who competed for Whitman College in 2001–04  and has competed recreationally since 2009. She has four victories in lesser events up to 10 km, all earned in 2009. She was a late qualifier to the 2010 Winter Olympics in Vancouver, her second ever international skiing competition following the 2010 World Cup in Canmore.

Personal life
Born and raised in Seattle, Washington, Brooks began skiing as a young girl, primarily at Snoqualmie Pass where her family owned a cabin and she took lessons through the Junior Nordic Program. She competed in Nordic skiing events in high school and college, but never raced at NCAA's.  She currently is a full-time coach at Alaska Pacific University, where she coaches juniors, masters and women's only ski groups. Brooks has three siblings who are triplets. Brooks is married to Anchorage firefighter Robert Whitney. She currently resides full-time in Anchorage. Brooks won the 2012 and 2014 Women's Mount Marathon in Seward, Alaska. In 2014, she won with a time of 52 minutes, 48.16 seconds, less than three seconds ahead of defending champion Marvin, a Palmer woman who clocked 52:50.51.

Vancouver 2010 Olympics
It was announced on 26 January 2010 that Brooks had qualified for the 2010 Winter Olympics. She competed in five events. Her best finish was 12th in the 4 × 5 km relay and her best individual finish of 36th in the 30 km event. Her entrance to the Olympics came as a surprise as she was not a full-time athlete, and had only recently begun to think about skiing at an elite level.

Sochi 2014 Olympics
On 22 January 2014, Brooks was selected to represent the United States at the 2014 Winter Olympics.

Cross-country skiing results
All results are sourced from the International Ski Federation (FIS).

Olympic Games

World Championships

World Cup

Season standings

Team podiums
1 podium – (1 )

References

1982 births
American female cross-country skiers
Tour de Ski skiers
Cross-country skiers at the 2010 Winter Olympics
Cross-country skiers at the 2014 Winter Olympics
Living people
Olympic cross-country skiers of the United States
Whitman College alumni
21st-century American women